General elections were held in the British Virgin Islands on 12 November 1990.  The result was a decisive victory for the incumbent Virgin Islands Party (VIP) led by Chief Minister Lavity Stoutt.  Three other parties contested the election: the BVI United Party (UP) led by Conrad Maduro (which fielded six candidates), the newly formed Progressive People's Democratic Party (PPDP) led by former Chief Minister Willard Wheatley (which fielded five candidates), and the newly formed Independent People's Movement (IPM) which fielded only two candidates.  The only candidate from a party other than the VIP to be elected was Omar Hodge of the IPM in the Sixth District (Omar Hodge was a former member of the VIP and would later rejoin that party).  Independent candidates won in the Fourth and Fifth Districts, and the VIP won every other available seat.

The supervisor of elections was Eugenie Todman-Smith.  The turnout was 69.4%.  In the individual seats, turnout was highest in the 9th District (91.1%), a record for district turnout in the British Virgin Islands.  The turnout was so high that the losing candidate in the 9th District (Allen O'Neal) actually secured more votes than the victorious candidate in every other district except for Lavity Stoutt in the 1st.

Results
The VIP led by Lavity Stoutt won an outright majority of 6 of the 9 available seats.

By constituency
First Electoral District

Total number of registered voters: 1,109
Total number of votes cast: 606
Percentage of voters who voted: 55%

Second Electoral District

Total number of registered voters: 533
Total number of votes cast: 359
Percentage of voters who voted: 67.4%

Third Electoral District

Total number of registered voters: 836
Total number of votes cast: 540
Percentage of voters who voted: 64.6%

Fourth Electoral District

Total number of registered voters: 897
Total number of votes cast: 640
Percentage of voters who voted: 71.3%
Spoiled ballots: 3

Fifth Electoral District

Total number of registered voters: 910
Total number of votes cast: 648
Percentage of voters who voted: 71%
Spoiled ballots: 3

Sixth Electoral District

Total number of registered voters: 929
Total number of votes cast: 647
Percentage of voters who voted: 69.6%
Spoiled ballots: 2

Seventh Electoral District

Total number of registered voters: 550
Total number of votes cast: 419
Percentage of voters who voted: 76.2%

Eighth Electoral District

Total number of registered voters: 724
Total number of votes cast: 525
Percentage of voters who voted: 72.5%

Ninth Electoral District

Total number of registered voters: 959
Total number of votes cast: 874
Percentage of voters who voted: 91.1%

IPM = Independent People's Movement
PPDP = Progressive People's Democratic Party
UP = BVI United Party
VIP = Virgin Islands Party

Lavity's Stoutt's 85.8% share of the vote in the 1st District remains a record in the British Virgin Islands.

References

Elections in the British Virgin Islands
British Virgin
General election
British Virgin
November 1990 events in North America